Route 34 may refer to:

Route 34 (WMATA), a bus route in Washington, D.C.
London Buses route 34
SEPTA Route 34, a Philadelphia Subway-Surface Trolley line.

See also
List of highways numbered 34

34